Tom and Jerry are fictional characters that starred in a series of early sound cartoons produced by the Van Beuren Studios, and distributed by RKO Pictures. The series lasted from 1931 to 1933.

American cartoon artist Joseph Barbera began his career as an animator and storyman on this series. In 1940, Barbera co-created with William Hanna another duo of cartoon characters for MGM using the same names: a cat and mouse named Tom and Jerry. When Official Films purchased the Van Beuren library in the early 1940s, the characters were renamed Dick and Larry to avoid confusion with MGM's Tom and Jerry. Today, animation historians refer to the original Tom and Jerry characters as Van Beuren's Tom and Jerry. Today, all of these cartoons are in the public domain.

Description
The characters were a Mutt and Jeff-like pair, one short (Jerry) and one tall (Tom). Each cartoon featured a different adventure and the plot varied from film to film. Sometimes they were lawyers, hunters, plumbers, hobos, etc. The duo were likely named after the stage play and/or the mixed drink of the same name, both of which predated the duo by a century through an 1821 book titled Life in London written by Pierce Egan (British sportswriter and author of Boxiana), which was based on George Cruikshank's, Isaac Robert Cruikshank's, and Egan's own careers. Stylistically, the cartoons were similar to those made by Fleischer Studios, which like Van Beuren Studios was located in New York City; one 1932 short, Piano Tooners, even introduced a "flapper" character similar to Fleischer's Betty Boop, and Maltin (1980) says "it's probable that one of the women who did Betty Boop's voice . . . also worked on recording sessions for this studio." According to Markstein's Toonopedia, Fleischer staff sometimes moonlighted at Van Beuren's, which was situated just across the road, and this accounts for the many visual similarities between the two.  Tom and Jerry's adventures were generally absurd comedies featuring music as sound effects.  Tom and Jerry, however, did not obtain popularity of the type Mickey Mouse, Betty Boop, and Bosko had, and the series was cancelled in 1933.

Filmography

Home video availability
Thunderbean Animation released a complete set of the series on DVD in 2010. There is currently a Blu-ray in the works from the same company.

Also, Mill Creek Entertainment released 12 shorts out of 26 as part of the Giant 600 Cartoon Collection, 150 Cartoon Classics, 100 Classic Cartoons, and 200 Classic Cartoons DVD sets. The series appeared on Tom Sawyer, And Other Cartoon Treasures, including Tom and Jerry shorts.

Some shorts were eventually restored on some Cartoon Roots Blu-ray releases. It was also released on DVD as Tom and Jerry & Friends: The Tuba Tooter as part of the Digiview Productions’ Cartoon Craze series. The short (The Tuba Tooter) was included on one of the discs of 350 Classic Cartoons as well.

See also
 List of films in the public domain in the United States

References

External links
 Before the Cat and Mouse: Van Beuren's Tom and Jerry
 Plane Dumb, a Tom and Jerry cartoon
 Public Domain Movie Torrents with PDA iPod Divx PSP versions
 TOM & JERRY: Antes del gato y el ratón (Spanish)

 
Animated duos
Animated film series
Film characters introduced in 1931
Film series introduced in 1931
Van Beuren Studios